Nimrod (National Institute Machine Radiating on Downs, "the Mighty Hunter" Nimrod; name attributed to W. Galbraith) was a 7 GeV proton synchrotron operating in the Rutherford Appleton Laboratory  in the United Kingdom between 1964 and 1978. Nimrod delivered its last particles at 17:00 hrs on 6 June 1978. Although roughly contemporary with the CERN PS its conservative design used the "weak focussing" principle instead of the much more cost-effective "strong-focussing" technique, which would have enabled a machine of the same cost to reach much higher energies.

The design and construction of Nimrod was carried out at a capital cost of approximately £11 million. It was used for studies of nuclear and sub-nuclear
phenomena.

Nimrod was dismantled and the space it occupied reused for the synchrotron of the ISIS neutron source.

Magnet power supply
The magnet power supply included 2 motor-alternator-flywheel sets. Each drive motor was 5,000 HP. Each flywheel was 30 tonnes. Each alternator was 60 MVA 12.8kV. Magnet currents would pulse at 10,550 A.

References

http://www.isis.stfc.ac.uk/about-isis/target-station-2/publications/issue-1-september-20038209.pdf

Nuclear research institutes
Particle physics facilities
Research institutes in Oxfordshire
Synchrotron radiation facilities
Vale of White Horse